Zieten was a German fishing trawler that was requistioned by the Kriegsmarine in the Second World War for use as a Vorpostenboot, serving as V 213 Zieten and V 204 Zieten. She was scuttled in January 1945 but was raised later that year and rebuilt as the survey ship Astrolabe. She served with the French Navy 1947–48 and was sold for use as a fishing trawler. In service until 1953, she was scrapped the following year.

Description
The engine was made by Bremer Vulkan, Vegesack, Germany. It was rated at 116nhp. The engine powered a single screw propeller driven via a low pressure turbine, double reduction gearing and a hydraulic coupling.

History
Zieten was built as yard number 709 by Bremer Vulkan, Vegesack, for the Hochseefischerei F. A. Pust, Wesermünde, Germany. The Code Letters DEAJ and fishing boat registration PG 419 were allocated.

On 17 September 1939, Zieten was requisitioned by the Kriegsmarine for use as a Vorpostenboot. She was allocated to 2 Vorpostenflotille as V 213 Zieten. In January 1945, she was redesignated V 204 Zieten.  She was scuttled as a blockship at Nantes, Loire-Inférieure, France later that year. She was later raised and by 1 January 1946 was under rebuild at Cherbourg, Manche, France. She was renamed Astrolabe on 21 January 1947 and arrived at L'Orient, Morbihan on 21 September 1947 for conversion to a survey vessel. The Pennant Number P666 was allocated. On 4 November 1948, she was removed from the Navy List and was returned to service as a fishing trawler. She was condemned on 19 December 1953 and was sold in L'Orient for scrapping in 1954.

References

Sources

1934 ships
Ships built in Bremen (state)
Fishing vessels of Germany
Steamships of Germany
World War II merchant ships of Germany
Auxiliary ships of the Kriegsmarine
Maritime incidents in 1945
Shipwrecks in the Bay of Biscay
Survey ships of the French Navy
Steamships of France
Merchant ships of France